Vanitas is the seventh full-length studio album by British extreme metal band Anaal Nathrakh. It was released on 23 October 2012 on Candlelight Records. The album was released in North America on 6 November 2012.

Track listing

Personnel

Anaal Nathrakh
Dave Hunt (a.k.a. V.I.T.R.I.O.L.) – vocals
Mick Kenney (a.k.a. Irrumator) – guitar, bass, programming, artwork, production

Additional personnel
Dave Nassie – guitars ("In Coelo Quies, Tout Finis Ici Bas")
Steeve Hurdle – guitars ("Feeding the Beast")
Elena Vladi – additional vocals ("You Can't Save Me, So Stop Fucking Trying")
Robert "Bob" Mercier – recording ("Feeding the Beast")

References

Anaal Nathrakh albums
2012 albums
Candlelight Records albums